Triple M is an Australian radio network.

Triple M or variation, may also refer to:

 Triple M Sydney (call sign 2MMM), the first radio station in the Triple M network, originally branded "Triple M"
 WMMM-FM (branded "Triple M"), a radio station in Madison, Wisconsin, US
 WMMM (branded "Triple M"), former call sign for WSHU (AM), Westport, Connecticut, US
KMMM (branded "Triple M"), an AM radio station in Pratt, Kansas, US
KMMM-FM, (branded "Triple M") former call sign for KHTT, an FM radio station in Tulsa, Oklahoma, US

See also

 MMM (disambiguation)
 3M (disambiguation)
 M3 (disambiguation)